Višķi (Latgalian:Vyški, Yiddish: ווישקי Vishki) is a village in Višķi Parish, Augšdaugava Municipality in the Latgale region of Latvia.

History 
Until the 1930s Višķi was a shtetl, where the majority of the inhabitants were Jewish. During World War II, from 1941 to 1942, hundreds of Jews were murdered in mass executions perpetrated by Einsatzgruppen in the surroundings and in the Daugavpils Ghetto.

People
Eliezer Palchinsky (1912-2007), rosh yeshiva in Jerusalem.

References

External links 
 Satellite map at Maplandia.com
 Wyszki in the Geographical Dictionary of the Kingdom of Poland

Towns and villages in Latvia
Shtetls
Jewish Latvian history
Holocaust locations in Latvia
Augšdaugava Municipality
Dvinsky Uyezd
Latgale